William Albert Wilson (November 3, 1914 – December 5, 2009) was an American diplomat and businessman from Los Angeles. From 1984 to 1986, he served as the first U.S. Ambassador to the Holy See.

Early life and education
Wilson's father was an engineer in the oil-tool business and his mother a Canadian. Wilson attended college at Stanford University, where he earned a Bachelor of Science degree in mechanical engineering in 1936 and a Master of Science degree in mechanical engineering in 1937. While attending Stanford, he met his wife, Elizabeth "Betty" Johnson, the daughter of Pennzoil co-founder Luther Johnson. They married in 1938 and he converted to her religion, Catholicism. Together, they went on to have two daughters. She later died in 1996.

During World War II, Wilson served as a captain in the Army Ordnance Corps. He later was employed by his family's business, Web Wilson Oil Tools, and went on to become its president, until the company's sale in 1960. After that, Wilson had a successful career as a real estate developer, cattle rancher, and investor.

Political career
A close friend of President Ronald Reagan, Wilson was appointed on the 11th of February 1981 as the personal representative of the President to the Holy See, when the United States still did not have full diplomatic relations with the Vatican. At the time, a 1867 U.S. Anti-Catholic law which had prevented the U.S. from establishing relations with the Vatican, was still in effect. In 1984, the law was repealed. Following this, Reagan nominated Wilson as the first United States Ambassador to the Holy See on January 10.

As Ambassador, he became involved with a scandal after being reprimanded, following his contact with Marc Rich, a commodities trader who had fled to Switzerland to avoid prosecution for racketeering, fraud, and tax evasion. He also had relations with Archbishop Paul Marcinkus, head of the Vatican Bank during the midst of a financial scandal.

In January 1986, Wilson flew to Libya for an unauthorized secret meeting with Moammar Kadafi, just several days after terror attacks in Vienna and Rome had reportedly killed 20 people. U.S. officials believed Libya was responsible for the attacks and had urged the international community to isolate Kadafi. U.S. Secretary of State George Shultz called Wilson's actions an “embarrassment.” Following this, Wilson submit his resignation, with the state department stating that he resigned to return to private life. They refused to say whether his resignation was tied to the Kadafi meeting.

Death
Wilson died of cancer in his home on the 5th of December 2009, aged 95. According to his daughter, Marcia Wilson Hobbs, he passed at approximately 1 AM. He was survived by his two daughters, six grandchildren, and eleven great-grandchildren.

Nancy Reagan issued a statement in response, saying "I am deeply saddened at the death of Bill Wilson. He was a dear friend for many years and a close advisor to my husband."

References

External links
William A. Wilson Papers Georgetown University Libraries Special Collections
The Hon. William Wilson 1999 profile from Thomas Aquinas College
Amb. William A. Wilson, Director  profile from Commodore Applied Technologies, Inc.
Carl Bernstein, The U.S. and The Vatican on Birth Control Time, February 24, 1992

1914 births
2009 deaths
Stanford University School of Engineering alumni
Ambassadors of the United States to the Holy See
Amateur radio people
Businesspeople from Los Angeles
20th-century American diplomats